The Beitou-Shilin Technology Park (BSTP) is an industrial park located in the Zhoumei area on the south side of Beitou District, Taipei City, Taiwan.

Location

It is located at the junction of Beitou District and Shilin District, bordering on academic landmarks such as Taipei Children's Amusement Park, National Taiwan Science Education Center, and Taipei Astronomical Museum. There are several hospitals, National Yang Ming Chiao Tung University, Taipei Veterans General Hospital and other landmarks nearby. Therefore, the park is developed with the "smart health industry" as the main axis, and is regarded by Taipei City as the next emerging industry development area in the city.

Overview
The Beitou-Shilin Technology Park aims to introduce private capital and resources, attract high-end industries such as ICT, biotechnology, other emerging technologies as well as promoting the overall industrial development of the city.

Transportation

Metro
Tamsui–Xinyi line: 
Mingde metro station
Zhishan metro station

Road 
 ZhouMei Expressway

See also
 Economy of Taiwan
 Nankang Software Park

References

External links
 Beitou-Shilin Technology Park

Buildings and structures in Taipei
Economy of Taipei
Industrial parks in Taiwan